Constantino Esteves (October 22, 1914 – 1985) was a Portuguese film director.

External links 
The Complete Index to World Film 

1914 births
1985 deaths
Portuguese film directors